The Ethel Barrymore Theatre is a Broadway theater at 241 West 47th Street in the Theater District of Midtown Manhattan in New York City. Opened in 1928, it was designed by Herbert J. Krapp in the Elizabethan, Mediterranean, and Adam styles for the Shubert family. The theater, named in honor of actress Ethel Barrymore, has 1,058 seats and is operated by the Shubert Organization. Both the facade and the auditorium interior are New York City landmarks.

The ground-floor facade is made of rusticated blocks of terracotta. The theater's main entrance consists of two archways and a doorway shielded by a marquee. The upper stories contain an arched screen made of terracotta, inspired by Roman baths, which is surrounded by white brick. The auditorium contains ornamental plasterwork, a sloped orchestra level, a large balcony, and a coved ceiling with a  dome. The balcony level contains box seats topped by decorative arches. The theater was also designed with a basement lounge and a now-demolished stage house.

The Shubert brothers developed the Barrymore Theatre after Ethel Barrymore agreed to have the brothers manage her theatrical career. It opened on December 20, 1928, with The Kingdom of God, and was the last pre-Depression house developed by the Shuberts. Ethel Barrymore only worked with the Shuberts until 1932 and last performed in the theater in 1940. The Barrymore has consistently remained in use as a legitimate theater since its opening, hosting plays and musicals; it is one of the few Broadway theaters to have never been sold or renamed. The theater was refurbished in the 1980s and the 2000s.

Site

The Ethel Barrymore Theatre is on 243 West 47th Street, on the north sidewalk between Eighth Avenue and Broadway, near Times Square in the Theater District of Midtown Manhattan in New York City. The Barrymore shares the block with the Samuel J. Friedman Theatre to the west, the Longacre Theatre to the north, and the Morgan Stanley Building to the east. Other nearby buildings include the Eugene O'Neill Theatre and Walter Kerr Theatre to the north; Crowne Plaza Times Square Manhattan to the northeast; 20 Times Square to the east; the Hotel Edison and Lunt-Fontanne Theatre to the south; and the Lena Horne Theatre and Paramount Hotel to the southwest.

Design
The Ethel Barrymore Theatre was designed by Herbert J. Krapp in several styles and was constructed in 1928 for the Shubert brothers. The theater is named after actress Ethel Barrymore (1879–1959), a prominent member of the Barrymore family of actors, and is operated by the Shubert Organization. The Barrymore has been used continuously as a legitimate house and, unlike most Broadway theaters, has never been sold or renamed since its opening. The Barrymore was the last theater to be built by the Shubert Organization until 2003.

Facade

The facade is symmetrically arranged. The ground floor is clad in rusticated blocks of terracotta, painted in a limestone color, above a granite water table. At ground level, the auditorium entrance includes two arched openings, each with four aluminum and glass doors. The voussoirs of the arches are made of rusticated blocks, while the keystones at the centers of each arch are shaped like brackets. Within each arch, the spaces above the doors are infilled with black glazed tiles; originally, these spaces were filled with metal tracery. Between the arched doors is a smaller doorway, which is topped by a large keystone. Above all of these openings is a marquee with the name "Barrymore", which is supported by ornate bronze brackets. The presence of the large marquee obscures the contrast between the ground floor and upper stories. The brackets originally supported a smaller bronze-and-glass canopy, which curved upward in front of either arch.

On either side of the doors are terracotta niches with bronze-framed sign boards. Above the signboards are terracotta wreaths, which surround circular panels with the gilded letters "The Barrymore Theater". Each wreath is topped by a curved pediment. The western and eastern portions of the facade are recessed slightly and contain recessed openings. The opening to the east is marked as the stage door. A frieze, decorated with leaf and wave moldings, runs above the first floor. To the east, there was originally a stage house with fire escapes on its facade, but this has since been replaced with the Morgan Stanley Building.

The upper stories are faced in bonded glazed-white brick. The central part of the facade includes a terracotta screen with an Ancient Roman-inspired pattern, surrounded by a cord molding. The screen includes a grid of squares, each of which contain central medallions with bars radiating in eight directions. To the left of the screen, the wall contains a sign with the name "Barrymore" and a metal fire escape. A metal sign hangs from the facade to the right. The top of the screen curves upward in a manner resembling a proscenium arch, and a brick parapet rises above the screen. A Greek key frieze and a cornice with talon moldings runs above the entire facade.

Auditorium
The auditorium has an orchestra level, one balcony, boxes and a stage behind the proscenium arch. The space is designed with plaster decorations in low relief. The auditorium is shaped almost as a square. According to the Shubert Organization, the auditorium has 1,058 seats; meanwhile, Playbill cites 1,039 seats and The Broadway League cites 1,096 seats. The physical seats are divided into 582 seats in the orchestra, 196 at the front of the balcony, 256 at the rear of the balcony, and 24 in the boxes. There were originally 1,100 seats, divided into 570 in the orchestra, 494 in the balcony, and 36 in the boxes.

The seats were designed to be "unusually comfortable", with steel backs and bottoms. A source from the theater's opening cited the auditorium as having an old-gold and brown color scheme. The interior uses a combination of Elizabethan, Mediterranean, and Adam-style design motifs.

Seating areas
The rear of the orchestra contains a promenade. The rear wall of the promenade contains three doorways, above which is a frieze. The promenade ceiling is curved and contains Elizabethan strapwork patterns. There is a wrought iron balustrade between the orchestra promenade and the last row of orchestra seating. Two staircases lead from either end of the promenade to the balcony level; they contain wrought-iron railings with shield and strapwork motifs. The orchestra is raked, sloping down toward the stage. The side walls of the orchestra contain a wainscoting that is divided into panels. The walls were originally painted cinnamon and gold. There are lighting sconces on the walls.

The balcony level is cantilevered above the orchestra and is divided into front and rear sections by an aisle halfway across its depth. The crossover aisle connects to segmentally arched exit doors on both of the side walls. There are console brackets above the arched exit doors, which support terraces that project slightly from an opening on either wall. The rest of the balcony's side walls are made of simple plaster and contain wall sconces. The front rail of the balcony contains high-relief strapwork patterns, which have been covered over with light boxes. The underside of the balcony has plasterwork panels with crystal light fixtures suspended from medallions. The original lighting fixtures, consisting of inverted bowls of cut glass, have since been replaced. Air-conditioning vents are placed along some of the panels under the balcony, as well as at the balcony's rear. There is a technical booth behind the balcony's rear wall.

At orchestra level is a wainscoted wall interrupted by three segmental-arched openings, one beneath each box. The undersides of the boxes contain moldings and crystal light fixtures similar to those on the balcony. The box fronts are decorated with three Elizabethan-style plasterwork bands. From bottom to top, the bands depict shields with putti's faces; rosettes; and strapwork around shields. Immediately behind the boxes are six gold-colored, fluted pilasters with Ionic capitals. There are half-columns in front of the pilasters that flank the center box. Above the pilasters is an architrave with plaster strapwork reliefs, as well as a balustrade containing vase-shaped balusters. There is a lunette above the balustrade; it includes a square shield motif, which is connected by latticework bands to sphinxes on either side. The lunette is surrounded by strapwork bands and several concentric semicircular arches. The semicircular arches have design motifs such as shells, shields, anthemia, and half-columns. The arches, combined with the lunette, constitute a sunburst pattern. The boxes and semicircular arches are surrounded by a plaster frame.

Other design features
Next to the boxes is a three-centered proscenium arch. The archway is surrounded by a wide band with strapwork motifs, with narrow bands of leaves on either side. The spandrels, above the corners of the proscenium arch, contain decorative motifs. There are traps throughout the entire stage, as well as a counterweight fly system.

The ceiling rises  from the floor of the orchestra. At the center of the dome is a grilled centerpiece, which is surrounded by several Elizabethan-style circles, as well as four medallions placed at 90-degree angles. A glass chandelier hangs from the center of the dome. The rest of the dome is divided into wedge-shaped sections, which are arranged in a circular pattern around the centerpiece. Outside of the dome, the coved ceiling contains latticework panels, surrounded by a strapwork pattern. Where the coved ceiling curves onto the side walls, there is a band with water-leaf motifs. Originally, this band was colored in green, gold, and gray.

Other interior spaces 
The theater was built with a general lounge in the basement, which measured . Separate spaces in the lounge were provided for women and men, and there was also a telephone booth. According to contemporary news articles, the basement lounge was decorated with an ivory-colored strapwork ceiling, modeled after English designs. The lounge had antique Elizabethan furniture, a mulberry-and-taupe carpet, and walls with an "old English texture in antique color". When the theater opened, Gilbert Miller lent a bronze bust of Ethel Barrymore, which was designed by A. C. Laddy. The basement also had a large dressing room for choruses.

On the first floor, Ethel Barrymore had her own modern-style reception and dressing room. The second floor had a chorus room and a smaller dressing room. The theater was built with three additional floors, each with four dressing rooms.

History
Times Square became the epicenter for large-scale theater productions between 1900 and the Great Depression. During the 1900s and 1910s, many theaters in Midtown Manhattan were developed by the Shubert brothers, one of the major theatrical syndicates of the time. The Shuberts originated from Syracuse, New York, and expanded downstate into New York City in the first decade of the 20th century. The brothers controlled a quarter of all plays and three-quarters of theatrical ticket sales in the U.S. by 1925. The Shuberts continued to build Broadway theaters in the 1920s, with the construction of four theaters on 48th and 49th Streets, as well as the Imperial Theatre on 45th Street.

Development and early years 

In 1927, playwright Zoe Akins told Ethel Barrymore about an offer from the Shubert brothers, who proposed developing a Broadway theater and naming it in her honor if she agreed to be represented by the Shuberts. Barrymore agreed, and the Shuberts hired Krapp to design the theater, construction of which started in late April or early May 1928. At the time, Barrymore was 48 years old and a prominent theatrical personality; she had been represented by the Frohman brothers for almost her entire career. In September 1928, Lee Shubert announced that the theater would open the next month, with Barrymore starring in G. Martinez Sierra's play The Kingdom of God. The theater's completion was delayed, prompting The Kingdom of God to go on a several-week tour.

The Barrymore Theatre ultimately opened on December 20, 1928. During the opening, which was attended by many New York City socialites, Ethel Barrymore received seven curtain calls before she was able to give a speech thanking the Shuberts. The Barrymore Theatre received so many items of Barrymore memorabilia that, within a month of the theater's opening, the Shuberts considered creating a library to house these gifts. Ethel Barrymore appeared at her eponymous theater again in 1929, when she co-starred with Louis Calhern in The Love Duel, which ran for 88 performances. The Barrymore's next several plays did not feature Ethel Barrymore. These included a transfer of John Drinkwater's comedy Bird in Hand in September 1929, as well as Death Takes a Holiday that December, the latter of which had a comparatively long run of 181 performances.

1930s and 1940s 
In 1930, the theater staged the comedy Topaze and the romance His Majesty's Car.  Ethel Barrymore's next appearance at the Barrymore was in the short-lived blackface comedy Scarlet Sister Mary in November 1930, which saw the Broadway debut of the actress's daughter, Ethel Barrymore Colt. More successful was The Truth Game with Ivor Novello and Billie Burke, which opened that December and had 105 performances. In 1931, the Barrymore hosted Mélo with Edna Best and Basil Rathbone, followed that November by Ethel Barrymore in The School for Scandal, whose son John Drew Colt made his first Broadway appearance in that show. The Barrymore's productions in 1932 included a 144-performance run of Whistling in the Dark, as well as the short-lived comedy Here Today and a transfer of There's Always Juliet. The same year, Ethel Barrymore stopped performing under the Shuberts' management, prompting the brothers to remove her first name from the marquee. At the end of 1932, Fred Astaire and Claire Luce starred in the musical Gay Divorce, where Astaire performed without his sister Adele for the first time.

The theater's plays in 1933 included Design for Living with Alfred Lunt, Lynn Fontanne, and Noël Coward, as well as the mystery Ten Minute Alibi and the drama Jezebel. The Barrymore went into receivership the same year, and the receiver deeded the theater to the Barrymore Theater Corporation. The Barrymore had seven flops in 1934. Coward, Lunt, and Fontanne returned in January 1935 for the play Point Valaine, which lasted for only 56 performances. The Barrymore hosted a transfer of the play Distaff Side that March, and Philip Merivale and Gladys Cooper staged revivals of Shakespeare's Macbeth and Othello that October. The play Parnell opened in November 1935 and ran for 98 performances; it was followed by a double bill of Irwin Shaw's Bury the Dead and Prelude in April 1936, then Emlyn Williams's Night Must Fall that September. Clare Boothe Luce's The Women opened with an all-female cast in December 1936 and was a hit, running for 657 performances.

The Playwrights' Company next presented the musical Knickerbocker Holiday with Walter Huston in 1938. The next year, the Barrymore hosted No Time for Comedy with Katharine Cornell, Laurence Olivier, and Margalo Gillmore for 185 performances, and Key Largo with Paul Muni, Uta Hagen, and José Ferrer for 105 performances. In 1940, Ethel Barrymore appeared in the short-lived play An International Incident, her last appearance at her namesake theater. The musical Pal Joey, featuring Gene Kelly and Vivienne Segal with a score by Rodgers and Hart, opened later that year and ran for 270 performances before transferring to another theater. The next hit was Best Foot Forward with Rosemary Lane in 1941, which had 326 performances. Walter Kerr and Leo Brady's Count Me In had a short run in 1942, but Anton Chekhov's The Three Sisters with Katharine Cornell was more successful, with 123 performances. Another success was the war drama Tomorrow the World in 1943, which had 499 performances.

Revivals predominated at the theater in the mid-1940s. These included The Barretts of Wimpole Street and Pygmalion in 1945, as well as The Duchess of Malfi and Cyrano de Bergerac in 1946. In 1947, Gian Carlo Menotti presented a double bill of the musical plays The Telephone and The Medium at the theater, which ran for 212 performances. Later that year, the Barrymore presented Tennessee Williams's A Streetcar Named Desire, originally featuring Marlon Brando, Kim Hunter, Karl Malden, and Jessica Tandy. The play, one of several that Irene Mayer Selznick produced at the theater, ran for 855 performances over the next two years.

1950s to 1970s 

Menotti hosted another show at the Barrymore in 1950: the opera The Consul with Patricia Neway and Marie Powers. Later that year, the Barrymore hosted Bell, Book and Candle with husband-and-wife team Rex Harrison and Lilli Palmer, which ran for 233 performances. Another married couple starred in another hit in 1951: The Fourposter with Jessica Tandy and Hume Cronyn, who stayed for 632 performances. This was followed in 1953 by a transfer of Misalliance. The same year, the Barrymore staged Tea and Sympathy with Deborah Kerr, Leif Erickson, and John Kerr, which had 712 total performances. Shows in 1955 included The Desperate Hours; a personal appearance by Marcel Marceau; and the drama The Chalk Garden. Leonard Sillman's revue New Faces of 1956 ran for 220 performances, featuring Maggie Smith in her Broadway debut, as well as female impersonator T. C. Jones. Ketti Frings's adaptation of Look Homeward, Angel premiered in 1957 and ran 530 performances.

A Raisin in the Sun opened in March 1959, staying for seven months and running 530 total performances. When Ethel Barrymore died in June of that year, the theater's lights were dimmed in its namesake's honor. Another comedy, A Majority of One with Gertrude Berg and Cedric Hardwicke, moved to the Barrymore later that year and ran through June 1960. The Barrymore's productions of the early 1960s included Critic's Choice with Henry Fonda and Mildred Natwick in 1960; The Complaisant Lover with Michael Redgrave, Richard Johnson, and Googie Withers in 1961; and A Gift of Time with Fonda and Olivia de Havilland in 1962. Later in the decade, the theater hosted The Amen Corner in 1965, followed the next year by Wait Until Dark and a limited engagement by Les Ballets Africains. This was followed in 1967 by Peter Shaffer's twin production of Black Comedy and White Lies. The Barrymore's last hit of the 1960s was a revival of The Front Page in 1969.

The Barrymore hosted several hits in the 1970s, several of which won Tony Awards and other accolades. In 1970, Conduct Unbecoming opened at the Barrymore, featuring Michael Barrington and Jeremy Clyde. The next year, Alec McCowen appeared in The Philanthropist, as well as Melvin Van Peebles's musical Ain't Supposed to Die a Natural Death. The New Phoenix Repertory Company premiered at the Barrymore in late 1973, with three works: The Visit, Chemin de Fer, and Holiday. This was followed in 1974 by Noël Coward in Two Keys with Tandy, Cronyn, and Anne Baxter, a double bill of Coward's plays A Song at Twilight and Come Into the Garden, Maud. The Barrymore hosted the play Travesties with John Wood in 1975, as well as American Buffalo with Robert Duvall and I Love My Wife in 1977. The Barrymore's last hit of the decade was the 1979 play Romantic Comedy, featuring Mia Farrow and Anthony Perkins. During the run of Romantic Comedy, the Barrymore Theatre became one of the first theaters to distribute electronic headsets to help hard-of-hearing visitors. The theater also hosted a party in December 1979 to celebrate what would have been Ethel Barrymore's birthday.

1980s and 1990s 

The Barrymore continued to host hits in the early 1980s. These included Lunch Hour, which opened in 1980 with Gilda Radner and Sam Waterston, followed in 1981 by The West Side Waltz with Katharine Hepburn and Dorothy Loudon. Hume Cronyn returned to the Barrymore in 1982, making his playwriting debut with Foxfire, in which he costarred with Jessica Tandy and Keith Carradine. This was followed at the end of 1983 by Baby, which ran for 241 performances. The next year, David Rabe's Hurlyburly transferred from off-Broadway and ran for 343 performances. The Barrymore's productions in 1986 included the solo show Lillian with Zoe Caldwell, as well as Social Security, the latter of which ran for 385 performances through 1987. The August Wilson musical Joe Turner's Come and Gone opened at the Barrymore in 1988. The following year, the Barrymore hosted Metamorphosis with Mikhail Baryshnikov, as well as a 12-performance run of David Hare's The Secret Rapture. During the late 1980s, the Shuberts renovated the Barrymore as part of a restoration program for their Broadway theaters, and the Shuberts also sold the Barrymore's air rights for development.

The New York City Landmarks Preservation Commission (LPC) had started to consider protecting the Barrymore as a landmark in 1982, with discussions continuing over the next several years. The LPC designated the Barrymore's facade as a landmark on November 4, 1987, followed by the interior on November 10. This was part of the commission's wide-ranging effort in 1987 to grant landmark status to Broadway theaters. The New York City Board of Estimate ratified the designations in March 1988. The Shuberts, the Nederlanders, and Jujamcyn collectively sued the LPC in June 1988 to overturn the landmark designations of 22 theaters, including the Barrymore, on the merit that the designations severely limited the extent to which the theaters could be modified. The lawsuit was escalated to the New York Supreme Court and the Supreme Court of the United States, but these designations were ultimately upheld in 1992.

In 1990, the play Lettice and Lovage opened at the Barrymore, featuring Margaret Tyzack and Maggie Smith from the West End version of the play. The next year, the Lincoln Center Theater brought Mule Bone, a never-performed play written in 1930 by Langston Hughes and Zora Neale Hurston; it ran at the Barrymore for 67 performances. A limited revival of A Streetcar Named Desire, featuring Alec Baldwin and Jessica Lange, opened in 1992. Afterward, the off-Broadway hit The Sisters Rosensweig moved to the Barrymore in 1993, with 556 Broadway performances. The play Indiscretions opened in 1995 and had 220 performances; it was followed the next year by a 306-performance revival of Oscar Wilde's An Ideal Husband. Cy Coleman's off-off-Broadway musical The Life transferred to the Barrymore in 1997 and saw 465 performances. The Barrymore next hosted a revival of the Greek tragedy Electra in 1998, then the West End hit Amy's View and the musical Putting It Together in 1999.

2000s to present 

The Donmar Warehouse's production of The Real Thing and the Manhattan Theatre Club's version of The Tale of the Allergist's Wife were both performed at the Barrymore in 2000. The 777-performance run of The Tale of the Allergist's Wife was followed by shorter runs of Imaginary Friends in 2002, Salome in 2003, and Sly Fox in 2004. As part of a settlement with the United States Department of Justice in 2003, the Shuberts agreed to improve disabled access at their 16 landmarked Broadway theaters, including the Barrymore. The Barrymore Theatre was then renovated for $9 million in 2004. Next came a revival of Tennessee Williams's The Glass Menagerie in 2005 and the short-lived musical Ring of Fire in 2006. Later in 2006, a revival of Stephen Sondheim's Company opened at the Barrymore, running for 247 performances. The band Duran Duran, performing its album Red Carpet Massacre in November 2007, was forced to relocate due to the 2007 Broadway stagehand strike. The Barrymore's exterior was renovated as part of a two-year project that was completed in 2008.

The Barrymore hosted three David Mamet plays in the late 2000s: November and Speed-the-Plow in 2008, as well as Race in 2009. Eugène Ionesco's Exit the King was also performed at the Barrymore in 2009. The 2010 play Elling had nine performances before it flopped. This was followed in 2011 by the play Arcadia, as well as a special appearance, An Evening with Patti LuPone and Mandy Patinkin. The Barrymore hosted Death of a Salesman and  Chaplin in 2012; Macbeth and Betrayal in 2013; and A Raisin in the Sun in 2014. With the exception of the musical Chaplin, these productions were all revivals of plays. Next, the play The Curious Incident of the Dog in the Night-Time opened in late 2014 and ran for nearly two years. When The Curious Incident closed, the food show presenter Alton Brown had a limited appearance at the Barrymore in November 2016.

In 2017, the Barrymore hosted the plays The Present and Six Degrees of Separation. At the end of the same year, the Barrymore staged the musical The Band's Visit, which ran through early 2019. The play The Inheritance opened in November 2019 and was a few days short of its scheduled closing when the Barrymore shuttered on March 12, 2020, due to the COVID-19 pandemic. The theater reopened on September 4, 2021, with a limited revival of Waitress, which closed at the end of the year. The musical Paradise Square ran for three months from April to July 2022; it was followed by the first Broadway revival of the play The Piano Lesson, which opened at the theater in October 2022 and ran for three months. A transfer of the West End play Peter Pan Goes Wrong is scheduled to open at the Barrymore in early 2023.

Notable productions
Productions are listed by the year of their first performance.

1920s to 1990s

 1929: Death Takes a Holiday
 1930: Topaze
 1930: The Truth Game
 1930: Scarlet Sister Mary
 1931: Mélo
 1931: The School for Scandal
 1932: There's Always Juliet
 1932: Gay Divorce
 1933: Design for Living
 1934: Both Your Houses
 1934: Ruth Draper
 1935: Point Valaine
 1935: Othello
 1935: Macbeth
 1936: Bury the Dead
 1936: Night Must Fall
 1936: The Women
 1938: Knickerbocker Holiday
 1939: No Time for Comedy
 1939: Key Largo
 1940: Pal Joey
 1941: Best Foot Forward
 1942: R.U.R.
 1943: Three Sisters
 1945: Rebecca
 1945: The Barretts of Wimpole Street
 1945: Marinka
 1945: Pygmalion
 1946: The Duchess of Malfi
 1946: Cyrano de Bergerac
 1947: The Telephone/The Medium
 1947: A Streetcar Named Desire
 1949: The Rat Race
 1950: The Consul
 1950: Bell, Book and Candle
 1951: The Fourposter
 1952: I've Got Sixpence
 1953: Misalliance
 1953: Tea and Sympathy
 1955: The Desperate Hours
 1955: Marcel Marceau
 1955: The Chalk Garden
 1957: Small War on Murray Hill
 1957: Waiting for Godot
 1957: Look Homeward, Angel
 1959: A Raisin in the Sun
 1959: A Majority of One
 1960: The Hostage
 1960: Critic's Choice
 1961: The Complaisant Lover
 1962: Moby-Dick
 1964: The Passion of Josef D.
 1965: The Amen Corner
 1966: Wait Until Dark
 1966: We Have Always Lived in the Castle
 1966: Les Ballets Africains
 1967: Black Comedy/White Lies
 1967: The Little Foxes
 1968: Don't Drink the Water
 1968: The Seven Descents of Myrtle
 1968: Happiness Is Just a Little Thing Called a Rolls Royce
 1968: The Goodbye People
 1969: The Front Page
 1970: Conduct Unbecoming
 1971: The Philanthropist
 1971: Ain't Supposed to Die a Natural Death
 1972: Captain Brassbound's Conversion
 1972: Don't Play Us Cheap
 1973: The Visit
 1973: Holiday
 1974: A Song at Twilight/Come Into the Garden, Maud
 1975: The Night That Made America Famous
 1975: Travesties
 1976: Legend
 1976: Poor Murderer
 1977: American Buffalo
 1977: I Love My Wife
 1979: Romantic Comedy
 1981: The West Side Waltz
 1982: Is There Life After High School?
 1982: Foxfire
 1983: Baby
 1984: Hurlyburly
 1986: Social Security
 1988: Joe Turner's Come and Gone
 1988: The Secret Rapture
 1989: Rumors
 1990: Lettice and Lovage
 1991: Mule Bone
 1992: A Streetcar Named Desire
 1993: The Sisters Rosensweig
 1995: Indiscretions
 1996: An Ideal Husband
 1997: The Life
 1998: Electra
 1999: Amy's View
 1999: Putting It Together

2000s to present

 2000: The Real Thing
 2000: The Tale of the Allergist's Wife
 2002: Imaginary Friends
 2003: Salome
 2004: Sly Fox
 2005: The Glass Menagerie
 2006: Ring of Fire
 2006: Company
 2007: Red Carpet Massacre
 2008: November
 2008: Speed-the-Plow
 2009: Exit the King
 2009: Race
 2010: Elling
 2011: Arcadia
 2011: An Evening with Patti LuPone and Mandy Patinkin
 2012: Death of a Salesman
 2012: Chaplin
 2013: Macbeth
 2013: Betrayal
 2014: A Raisin in the Sun
 2014: The Curious Incident of the Dog in the Night-Time
 2016: Alton Brown Live: Eat Your Science
 2016: The Present
 2017: Six Degrees of Separation
 2017: The Band's Visit
 2019: The Inheritance
 2021: Waitress
 2022: Paradise Square
 2022: The Piano Lesson
 2023: Peter Pan Goes Wrong

Box office record
Waitress achieved the box office record for the Ethel Barrymore Theatre. It grossed $197,878 in ticket sales on September 3, 2021, breaking the previous single-performance house record at the Ethel Barrymore Theatre set by the production of Betrayal ($184,476).

See also 

 List of New York City Designated Landmarks in Manhattan from 14th to 59th Streets
 List of Broadway theaters

References

Notes

Citations

Sources

External links

 

1928 establishments in New York City
Broadway theatres
Theatres completed in 1928
New York City Designated Landmarks in Manhattan
New York City interior landmarks
Shubert Organization
Theater District, Manhattan